The 1962 Cleveland Indians season was a season in American baseball. The team finished sixth in the American League with a record of 80–82, 16 games behind the World Champion New York Yankees. Once again, the Indians got off to another fast start (48-36 at the All Star break), however they would lose their next nine games, 19 of their next 24, and 28 of their next 38 games to fall into the lower half of the standings. After the slump, the Indians would rebound slightly to win 22 of their final 40 games, but it was way too little far too late, and manager Mel McGaha would be finished by the end of the season. The Indians were one of only two American League teams to win the season series (Baltimore being the other one) against the Yankees (who would win the pennant, and later the World Series in 7 games over the San Francisco Giants), taking 11 of the 18 contests. However, they would go 9-9 against the 60-102 Senators.

Offseason 
 October 5, 1961: Jimmy Piersall was traded by the Indians to the Washington Senators for Dick Donovan, Gene Green, and Jim Mahoney
 November 16, 1961: Johnny Temple was traded by the Indians to the Baltimore Orioles for Harry Chiti, Ray Barker and Art Kay (minors).
 March 1962: Duke Carmel was purchased by the Indians from the St. Louis Cardinals.
 Prior to 1962 season: Rubén Gómez was acquired by the Indians from the Philadelphia Phillies.

Regular season

Season standings

Record vs. opponents

Notable transactions 
 April 2, 1962: Vic Power and Dick Stigman were traded by the Indians to the Minnesota Twins for Pedro Ramos.
 April 26, 1962: Harry Chiti was purchased from the Indians by the New York Mets.
 April 29, 1962: Bob Nieman was purchased from the Indians by the San Francisco Giants.
 June 9, 1962: Lou Piniella was signed as an amateur free agent by the Indians.
 June 15, 1962: Harry Chiti was returned to the Indians by the New York Mets.
 August 20, 1962: Rubén Gómez was traded by the Indians to the Minnesota Twins for Jackie Collum, a player to be named later and cash. The Twins completed the deal by sending Georges Maranda to the Indians on October 9.

Opening Day Lineup

Roster

Player stats

Batting

Starters by position 
Note: Pos = Position; G = Games played; AB = At bats; H = Hits; Avg. = Batting average; HR = Home runs; RBI = Runs batted in

Other batters 
Note: G = Games played; AB = At bats; H = Hits; Avg. = Batting average; HR = Home runs; RBI = Runs batted in

Pitching

Starting pitchers 
Note: G = Games pitched; IP = Innings pitched; W = Wins; L = Losses; ERA = Earned run average; SO = Strikeouts

Other pitchers 
Note: G = Games pitched; IP = Innings pitched; W = Wins; L = Losses; ERA = Earned run average; SO = Strikeouts

Relief pitchers 
Note: G = Games pitched; W = Wins; L = Losses; SV = Saves; ERA = Earned run average; SO = Strikeouts

Farm system

References

External links 
1962 Cleveland Indians season at Baseball Reference

Cleveland Guardians seasons
Cleveland Indians season
Cleveland